Socket 5 was created for the second generation of Intel P5 Pentium processors operating at speeds from 75 to 133 MHz as well as certain Pentium OverDrive and Pentium MMX processors with core voltage 3.3 V. It superseded the earlier Socket 4. It was released in March 1994. Consisting of 320 pins, this was the first socket to use a staggered pin grid array, or SPGA, which allowed the chip's pins to be spaced closer together than earlier sockets. Socket 5 was replaced by Socket 7 in 1995.

External links
Differences between Socket 5 and Socket 7 (archived)

See also
 List of Intel microprocessors
 List of AMD microprocessors

References

Socket 005